Big Band Sound may refer to;

 Big Band, a genre of music associated with jazz which became popular during the Swing era
 "Big Band Sound", a 1970 album by Jo Stafford